Comendador Ermelino is a train station belonging to CPTM Line 12-Sapphire, located in Ermelino Matarazzo. Beside the station is located the neighbourhood's industrial park.

History
In mid-1921, the construction of the railway Variante de Poá began by Estrada de Ferro Central do Brasil. Besides they were almost completed and even the operation of esporadic trains since 1926, the railway was opened to the traffic officially on 1 January 1934, only for cargo trains. The opening for passengers happened on 1 May 1934. One of the stations was constructed of the then known Jardim Matarazzo, labor neighbourhood that hosted one of the factories of Indústrias Reunidas Fábricas Matarazzo. The station was opened in 1934, receiving the name of Ermelino Matarazzo. Even it has passed through many federal and state administrations, it worked in the original building of 1926, until it was demolished in 2006, with the commuters accessing a temporary station until 29 January 2008, when it was reopened by CPTM in a new building, replacing the old one.

References

Companhia Paulista de Trens Metropolitanos stations
Railway stations opened in 1934
Railway stations opened in 2008
1934 establishments in Brazil